John Evans (governor) may refer to:

John Evans (Colorado governor) (1814–1897), 2nd Governor of the Territory of Colorado
John Evans (Pennsylvania governor) (1678–?), 13th Colonial Governor of Pennsylvania
John Gary Evans (1863–1942), 85th Governor of South Carolina
John Evans (Idaho governor) (1925–2014), 27th Governor of Idaho

See also 
John Evans (disambiguation)